Józef Gąsienica (23 March 1941 in Zakopane – 14 May 2005 in Zakopane) was a Polish nordic combined skier who competed in the late 1960s and early 1970s. His best finish at the Winter Olympics was sixth in the Nordic combined event at Grenoble in 1968.

External links

Józef Gąsienica's profile at Sports Reference.com

1941 births
2005 deaths
Nordic combined skiers at the 1968 Winter Olympics
Nordic combined skiers at the 1972 Winter Olympics
Polish male Nordic combined skiers
Olympic Nordic combined skiers of Poland
Sportspeople from Zakopane
20th-century Polish people